Jason Perry (born 2 April 1970 in Caerphilly) is a Welsh former professional footballer and Wales international. A centre-half, he was highly regarded by supporters for his strong tackling and uncompromising style. He attained one cap for Wales in 1994.

Club career
Perry began his career at Cardiff City, making his debut in a 0–0 draw against Exeter City in March 1987, but it wasn't until the 1989–90 season that he managed to force his way into a regular first team place and helped the club to win promotion to Division Two in 1993. Perry hardly missed a game for the club up until the 1995–96 season when he suffered a number of injuries that kept him out of the side for most of the year. The following year he managed to bounce back to help the club reach the play-offs but was allowed to leave the club at the end of the season to join Bristol Rovers. After only one year he left the club and spells at Lincoln City and Hull City followed before he returned to Wales to sign for Newport County, working as a player-coach. He finished his career at Welsh Premier League side Cwmbran Town in 2005.

International career

During his career, Perry made one appearance for Wales when he played in a 3–1 defeat to Norway on 9 March 1994.

After football

Perry is now a Lecturer and the director of football at Bridgend College. He also works for the BBC as both a columnist and commentator covering Cardiff City and the Wales national team.

Honours
 Cardiff City
 Third Division: 1
 1992–93
 Fourth Division Runners-up: 1
 1987–88
 Welsh Cup finalists: 3
 1987–88, 1991–92, 1992–93

Newport County
 FAW Premier Cup finalists: 1
 2002–03

References

External links

Welsh Premier profile

1970 births
Living people
Footballers from Caerphilly
Cardiff City F.C. players
Bristol Rovers F.C. players
Lincoln City F.C. players
Hull City A.F.C. players
Newport County A.F.C. players
Cwmbrân Town A.F.C. players
Cymru Premier players
Welsh footballers
Wales international footballers
Wales under-21 international footballers
English Football League players
Association football defenders